Statistics of Kuwaiti Premier League for the 1995–96 season.

Overview
It was contested by 14 teams, and Kazma Sporting Club won the championship.

League standings

Championship playoff

References
Kuwait - List of final tables (RSSSF)

1995–96
1
1995–96 in Asian association football leagues